Blood in the Snow (Spanish: Sangre en la nieve) is a 1942 Spanish crime film directed by Ramón Quadreny. The film's plot deals with smuggling.

Cast
 Alfonso Albalat    
 Raúl Cancio  
 Alfonsina de Saavedra  
 Fernando Fernández de Córdoba  
 Emilio Graells  
 Marta Grau  
 José María Lado
 Alberto Nogue

References

Bibliography
 Bentley, Bernard. A Companion to Spanish Cinema. Boydell & Brewer 2008.

External links 

1942 films
1942 crime films
Spanish crime films
1940s Spanish-language films
Films directed by Ramón Quadreny
Spanish black-and-white films
1940s Spanish films